Bynino is a rural locality (a village) in Filippovskoye Rural Settlement, Kirzhachsky District, Vladimir Oblast, Russia. The population was 17 as of 2010. There are 13 streets.

Geography 
Bynino is located on the Bolshaya Dubna River, 35 km south of Kirzhach (the district's administrative centre) by road. Golovino is the nearest rural locality.

References 

Rural localities in Kirzhachsky District